Kerala State Highway 17, also called the Northern outlet road and Munnar - Udumalpet road, is notable for passing between the Anaimalai Hills and the Palani Hills, through or near three important protected areas and providing opportunities for viewing wildlife in unspoiled forests. 

Route

SH 17 starts north from  NH 49 (Aluva - Munnar Highway) at Munnar, running about 2 km alongside the Kannimala River, then to Rajamudi village  - Anakkalpetty road and on to Eravikulam village. It passes near Eravikulam National Park and Anamudi, The tallest Indian peak south of the Himalayas and into Marayoor town, (km 42). It then passes through the centre of Chinnar Wildlife Sanctuary, past Chinnar Watchtower and continues to Chinnar Check post, (km 59).

It enters Indira Gandhi Wildlife Sanctuary and National Park at Tamil Nadu check post and continues past Manjampatti Watchtower along the bottom of Manjampatti Valley. It passes through the park around Amaravathi Reservoir and Amaravathi Dam to exit the park at the Forest Department checkpost (km 71) near Amaravathinagar and the Sainik School, Amaravathinagar. It goes down onto the plains through Manupatti (km 75), Kurichkotti, through a large area of wind turbines, Pallapalyam, extensive agricultural fields, Bodipatti, across Southern Railway -  Salem Division tracks in Kanakkampalayam, and on to NH 209 at Udumalpet (km 85) in Tamil Nadu, South India.

Gallery

Notes

External links
 Travellers notes on this route

Tourism in Kerala
Scenic roads in India
State Highways in Kerala
Roads in Ernakulam district
Roads in Idukki district